John Mwaimba (born 30 March 1950) is a Zambian politician. He served as Member of the National Assembly for Kapiri Mposhi from 2002 until 2006.

Biography
Prior to entering politics, Mwaimba was a businessman. He contested the Kapiri Mposhi seat as the National Lima Party candidate in the 1996 general elections, but finished in third place. Prior to the 2001 general elections he was chosen as the Movement for Multi-Party Democracy (MMD) candidate and was elected to the National Assembly with a majority of 3,761. Following the elections he was appointed Deputy Minister of Information and Broadcasting Services. However, he was sacked by President Levy Mwanawasa in 2003 after being accused of fraud. In June 2004 he was made Deputy Minister of Local Government and Housing. He was later moved to become Deputy Minister of Works and Supply in 2006.

Mwaimba was not selected as the MMD candidate for the Kapiri Mposhi for the 2006 general elections.

References

1950 births
Living people
Zambian businesspeople
Movement for Multi-Party Democracy politicians
Members of the National Assembly of Zambia